Bullhead is the third studio album by American rock band Melvins, released in 1991 through Boner Records. The album has longer songs than previous Melvins albums. Before this, most of their songs were under two or three minutes.

Release
Bullhead was originally released in 1991 on vinyl, CD and cassette.  Boner Records re-released it on vinyl in 2015, paired with the previous album Ozma.

Reception and legacy
The Japanese experimental band Boris took their name from Bullheads first track.

The Richmond Times-Dispatch wrote that "the spare, chugging intensity of this three-piece Seattle noise unit continues to amaze."

Rolling Stone ranked Bullhead #60 on their list of the all time greatest metal albums. They felt that it announced the Melvins as a metal band, citing lengthier songs, a more precise feel and "not so fried" production as reasons. The magazine also felt "Your Blessened"s "optimistic churn" set the way for future metal bands Baroness and Torche.

Track listing
All tracks are written by Buzz Osborne.

Side one

Side two

Personnel
Dale Crover – drums
Buzz Osborne – guitar, vocals
Lori Black – bass
Jonathan Burnside – engineer

References

Melvins albums
1991 albums
Boner Records albums
Grunge albums